Nicholas Young (born c. 1757) was a British cabin boy aboard the Endeavour during Captain James Cook's first voyage of discovery. In 1769, Cook named the headland Young Nick's Head in Poverty Bay, New Zealand after him. 
In The Remarkable Story of Andrew Swan, it is stated that Young hailed from Greenock, on the Clyde.

On Captain Cook's Endeavour
Young was eleven years old when the Endeavour departed Plymouth, England on 26 August 1768. He was the personal servant of the Endeavour’s surgeon, William Brougham Monkhouse. 
In early October 1769, Cook offered a reward of rum to the man who first sighted land, and promised that 'that part of the coast of the said land should be named after him'. This was awarded to Young who first sighted land from the masthead at about 2pm on 6 October 1769.

After Young returned to Plymouth in July 1771, he became the servant of the Endeavour's botanist, Joseph Banks. In 1772, Young accompanied Banks on an expedition to Iceland, but nothing further is known about his life.

Legacy
On 10 October 1969, a bronze statue of Nicholas Young was unveiled by Governor-General Sir Arthur Porritt at Churchill Park on Waikanae Beach, Gisborne as part of the Cook Bicentenary Celebrations. The monument, sculpted by Frank Szirmay, depicts Young pointing towards the white cliffs of Young Nicks Head.

Further reading
Biography. Nicholas Young, apprenticed to William Brougham Monkhouse, surgeon on James Cook's Endeavour. Royal Geographical Society of South Australia    

 Stowaway (2000) Karen Hesse – a children's novel based on true historical events which recounts Captain Cook's voyage from Nicholas Young's point of view.

References

Notes

English sailors
1757 births
Year of death missing
James Cook
People from Greenock
British explorers of the Pacific